The 1985 Camus Hong Kong Masters was a professional non-ranking snooker tournament held in Hong Kong in September 1985.

Terry Griffiths won the tournament, defeating Steve Davis 4–2 in the final.

Main draw

References

Hong Kong Masters
1985 in snooker
1985 in Hong Kong sport